Joon may refer to:
 Joon (airline), a former French leisure airline based in Paris
 Joon (Chinese name)
 Joon (Korean name)
 Joon Wolfsberg, German singer and songwriter
 Pieter Joon, Dutch businessman, founded the World Organization Volleyball for Disabled 
 Rajiv Kumar Joon, Indian Army officer, received the Ashoka Chakra award
 Joon, a character in the film Benny & Joon
 Joon Yorigami, a character from Touhou Project

See also
 Jun (disambiguation)
 June (disambiguation)